Fretwell Park is a cricket ground in Cairns, Queensland, Australia.  The ground held a first-class match in 2006 when New Zealand Whites played Pakistan A as part of the 2006 Top End series.  The match was abandoned due to rain, as a result it was decided to replace the match with two List A games between the sides.  AFL is also played on this ground by the South Cairns Cutters.

References

External links
Fretwell Park at ESPNcricinfo
Fretwell Park at CricketArchive

2006 establishments in Australia
Sports venues completed in 2006
Cricket grounds in Queensland
Sports venues in Queensland
Buildings and structures in Cairns
Sport in Cairns